Lars Ångström (born March 30, 1955) is a Swedish Green Party politician, member of the Riksdag 1998–2006.

Lars Ångström was president of the Swedish Peace and Arbitration Society 1985–1995, and head of the Swedish Greenpeace organisation 1995–1996.

See also 
 Politics of Sweden

References

Living people
1955 births
Members of the Riksdag from the Green Party
Members of the Riksdag 1998–2002
Members of the Riksdag 2002–2006
20th-century Swedish politicians
21st-century Swedish politicians